Ribautiana is a genus of true bugs belonging to the family Cicadellidae. The species of this genus are found in North America, Europe, and Australia.

Species
The following species are recognised in the genus Ribautiana:
 Ribautiana alces (Ribaut, 1931) 
 Ribautiana cruciata (Ribaut, 1931) 
 Ribautiana debilis (J.W.Douglas, 1876) 
 Ribautiana foliosa (Knull, 1945) 
 Ribautiana luculla (Medler, 1943) 
 Ribautiana multispinosa Christian, 1953 
 Ribautiana ognevi (Zachvatkin, 1948) 
 Ribautiana parapiscator Christian, 1953 
 Ribautiana piscator (McAtee, 1926) 
 Ribautiana scalaris (Ribaut, 1931) 
 Ribautiana sciotoensis (Knull, 1945) 
 Ribautiana tenerrima (Herrich-Schaffer, 1834) 
 Ribautiana trifurcata Sharma, 1984 
 Ribautiana ulmi (Linnaeus, 1758) 
 Ribautiana unca (McAtee, 1926) 
 BOLD:AAN8288 (Ribautiana sp.)
 BOLD:AAN8410 (Ribautiana sp.)
 BOLD:ABX7901 (Ribautiana sp.)
 BOLD:ABX9684 (Ribautiana sp.)
 BOLD:ACC7813 (Ribautiana sp.)

References

Cicadellidae
Hemiptera genera